St Patrick's Roman Catholic Cemetery is a cemetery located in Waltham Forest, London. The cemetery is crossed by tarmac roadways and paths, with trees planted throughout including mature oak, poplar, Lombardy poplar, plane and sycamore. There are a number of fine monuments, including the striking modernist Ferrari mausoleum. It dates from 1965, and commemorates Lucia Ferrari, “Mamma adorabile”.

History 
It was opened in 1868 in response to the growing demand arising from population growth for consecrated burial space by the Catholic community in East London. It is one of only two Roman Catholic cemeteries in London (the other being a sister cemetery in West London, St Mary's Catholic Cemetery, Kensal Green).

The population of London grew and grew during the 19th century, as did the city's physical footprint. Places that were once small villages surrounded by fields were swallowed up by the growing metropolis, with rows of terraced homes replacing the open spaces. Some of these Victorian homes can be seen in the streets around St Patrick's cemetery – both Leyton and Leytonstone were among those places that grew up as suburbs after the arrival of the railways made it easier for people to commute into central London for work. Nearby Hackney saw its population rise from 38,000 in 1861 to a staggering 125,000 only ten years later. It catered for the sizeable Irish and Italian communities who lived in London in the 19th century and their descendants, as well as Catholics from other parts of Britain who moved to London to seek work.

The cemetery buildings, including its yellow brick Gothic mortuary chapel, were designed by the Roman Catholic architect Samuel J Nicholl. By the early 1980s 168,000 burials are recorded as having taken place at St Patrick's.

Notable burials 
 Donald Calthrop (1888–1940), actor
 Walter James Croot (1875–1897), bantamweight championship boxer
 Timothy Evans (1924–1950), wrongly convicted of the murder of his wife and daughter
 Stephen Lewis (1926–2015), actor
 Mary Jane Kelly (1863–1888), final victim of Jack the Ripper
 Patrick Mullane VC (1858–1919), Second Anglo-Afghan War Victoria Cross recipient
 Four Franciscan nuns drowned in the 1875 wreck of the

War graves
The war memorial consists of a raised platform with rows of white headstones hedged to the rear, with a white stone monument in the front. There are 147 Commonwealth burials of the 1914–1918 war here, those whose graves are not marked by headstones are commemorated on Special Memorial headstones erected in a row within the main War Plot. There are 134 Commonwealth burials of the 1939–1945 war here, those whose graves are not marked by headstones are commemorated on a Screen Wall Memorial in the main War Plot. There are also 2 Foreign National war burials and 3 non war service burials.

References

External links
 Leytonstoner Blog

Cemeteries in London
Commonwealth War Graves Commission cemeteries in England
London Borough of Waltham Forest
1868 establishments in England
Parks and open spaces in the London Borough of Waltham Forest
Religion in the London Borough of Waltham Forest